National Route 439 is a national highway of Japan connecting Tokushima, Tokushima and Shimanto, Kōchi in Japan, with a total length of 341.2 km (212.01 mi).

References

National highways in Japan
Roads in Kōchi Prefecture
Roads in Tokushima Prefecture